Hennessy & Hennessy was an architectural firm established in 1912 in Sydney, Australia that was responsible for a series of large scale office buildings in the 1930s in all capital cities in Australia, as well as New Zealand and South Africa, designed by John (Jack) Hennessy (1887–1955), described as Australia's first international architect. 

The firm was also responsible for many projects for the Catholic Church in Brisbane in the 1920s, including the never-built Holy Name Cathedral, Brisbane, which would have been 'the largest sacred building in the Commonwealth'. They were also the architects for the Great Court of the University of Queensland in Brisbane.

History

John Francis Hennessy, father and son 
The firm's name dates from the period when John Francis Hennessy took his son, also named John Francis (Jack) Hennessy, but often known as Jack Hennessy, into his architectural firm as a partner in 1912.

The first John Francis Hennessy (1853–1924) was born in Ireland about 1853, and grew up and trained in architecture in Leeds, and London. Deciding that there were more opportunities in Australia, he arrived in Sydney in 1880 and was soon appointed assistant to the City of Sydney architect, where he designed Centennial Hall of the Sydney Town Hall in 1883, (working on it after he left that position).

Jack Hennessy then went into private partnership with Joseph Ignatius Sheerin as Sheerin & Hennessy from 1884, and they went on to design a number of projects for the Catholic Church in Sydney, and the Cathedral in Armidale. Commercial designs included Hordern Bros' drapery store (1886), the Tattersall's Club (1892) in Pitt Street, and ten stores for (Sir) John See., and they also designed many large suburban residences were built to their plans.

Sheerin left the partnership in 1912, and Hennessy then went into partnership with his son, also named John Francis Hennessy, who was also known as Jack Hennessy, and the firm became Hennessy & Hennessy. Born in 1887, Jack Hennessy had studied architecture at Sydney Technical College and at the University of Pennsylvania, returning to Australia in 1911, joining his father's firm the next year. John Hennessy retired in 1923, and died on November 1924 and was buried in Rookwood Cemetery. Jack Hennessy became principal of the firm, retaining the name (though they were also known as Hennessy, Hennessy & Co.). In 1925-6 the firm had more partners and was briefly known as Hennessy & Hennessy, Keesing and Co and J.P. Donoghue, but after 1926 reverted to Hennessy, Hennessy & Co / Hennessy & Hennessy.

Architectural practice 
The year the younger Hennessy joined the firm they gained one of their most prestigious commissions, the completion of the huge Gothic Revival St Mary's Cathedral, Sydney. Designed by William Wardell, only the apse, crossing and transept had been finished; the Hennessy's were to build the nave and south front to Wardell's design, as well as the crypt, built to their design. Further commissions for the Catholic Church followed with St Patrick's Hall in Sydney in 1915.

Bishop James Duhig, having already become friends with the younger Hennessy, became a major patron once he was elevated to Archbishop of Brisbane in 1917. Beginning with the Convent of the Sacred Heart in Toowong, completed in 1920, Hennessy and Hennessy designed the Convent of the Sacred Heart (1922), St Vincent's Hospital (1922) and the Church of Saint Ignatius Loyola(1929) all in Toowong, Corpus Christi Church in Nundah (1926) and the Villa Maria Convent, in Fortitude Valley, Brisbane (1928). They were also commissioned to complete the 19th century Brisbane Catholic Cathedral St Stephen's in 1920-22, in a smaller form than original envisaged because he had plans to build a far grander cathedral on another site. In 1925 Jack Hennessy produced a plan for a huge church intended to be "the largest sacred building in the Commonwealth" for a site in Fortitude Valley on the edge of the central city. The Renaissance/Baroque style design, inspired by St Paul's in London, had a dome and paired front towers, and was to be called the Holy Name Cathedral  Construction began in 1927, but by the early 1930s only some retaining walls and the crypt had been built, and no further work was ever undertaken.

In the 1930s Hennessy designed a series large office buildings for three different insurance firms in three countries, and has been described as Australia's first international architect. The series of buildings for the Colonial Mutual Life insurance company were all versions of each other, in different sizes, in an elaborate Romanesque/Norman style, complete with gargoyles.

Another major project was the Great Court, University of Queensland in St Lucia, Brisbane, built between 1938-1979.

In 1950, Hennessy was awarded over £25,000 by the court when he sued to recover his unpaid fees for the Holy Name Cathedral.

Hennessy died of heart disease at his eldest son's home in Sydney on September 4, 1955, at the age of 68. He was buried in the Roman Catholic Cemetery at Rookwood. The firm continued until 1968.

Corporate affairs

Major works 
 1912-1940s: completion of St Mary's Cathedral, Sydney
 1915: St Patrick's Parish Hall and Girls' School, Harrington Street, Sydney

1920: Stuartholme (Convent of the Sacred Heart), Toowong, Brisbane.
1922: Cathedral of St Stephen, Brisbane, apse and transepts
1922: St Vincent's Hospital, Toowoomba
1925-31: Christian Brothers' Training College (Mount St Mary) Strathfield, Sydney.
1926: Corpus Christi Church in Nundah, Brisbane
1927-28: Villa Maria Convent, Fortitude Valley, Brisbane
1929:  Church of Saint Ignatius Loyola in Toowong, Brisbane
1929: Additional floors to CML building, Martin Place, Sydney, later removed
1930-31: Colonial Mutual Life, Brisbane
1931-33: Colonial Mutual Life, Durban, South Africa
1934: Sacred Heart Church, Pymble, Sydney (now Ku Ring Gai town hall)
1934: Colonial Mutual Life, Adelaide
1935: Colonial Mutual Life, Wellington, New Zealand (demolished)
1934: Prudential Insurance, Wellington, New Zealand
1934-5: Cardinal Cerretti Memorial Chapel, St Patrick's Seminary, Manly, Sydney.
1935: Colonial Mutual Life, Port Elizabeth, South Africa
1936: Lawson Apartments, Perth
1936: Colonial Mutual Life, Perth (demolished)
1936: Australasian Catholic Assurance, Sydney
1936: Australasian Catholic Assurance, Melbourne
1937: Colonial Mutual Life, Hobart
1937: Colonial Mutual Life, Newcastle
1937 Challis House, Martin Place, Sydney
1937: St John of God Hospital, Belmont (Rivervale), Perth (demolished)
1937-79: Great Court, University of Queensland, St Lucia, Brisbane
1939: Colonial Mutual Life, Great Charles Street, Birmingham, UK
1939: Prudential Insurance, Martin Place, Sydney (demolished)

 1941: Pius XII Provincial Seminary, Banyo, Brisbane.

Gallery

References

External links
 

Architects from Sydney